A breaker is a powerful percussion hammer fitted to an excavator for demolishing hard (rock or concrete) structures. It is powered by an auxiliary hydraulic system from the excavator, which is fitted with a foot-operated valve for this purpose. Additionally, demolition crews employ the hoe ram for jobs too large for jackhammering or areas where blasting is not possible due to safety or environmental issues.

Breakers are often referred to as "hammers", "peckers", "hoe rams" or "hoe rammers". These terms are popular and commonly used amongst construction/demolition workers. The first hydraulic breaker, Hydraulikhammer HM 400, was invented in 1967 by German company Krupp (today German company Atlas Copco) in Essen.

See also
 Excavator

References

Info on hydraulic breaker repairs and maintenance

Bibliography
 

Hydraulic tools
Construction equipment
German inventions
1967 in science
1967 in Germany